Sayonara to Hello is a 2012 American documentary film by Nic Beery about an American magician who becomes famous in Japan. The film follows Zephyrhills, Florida native Steve Marshall, a former Ringling Bros. and Barnum & Bailey Circus clown on a monthlong tour from Florida to New York.

References

External links

2012 films
American documentary films
2012 documentary films
2010s English-language films
2010s American films